Victor Alfieri (born July 30, 1971) is an American actor and writer, born in Italy and raised in the U.S.

Biography
Alfieri was born in Rome and raised an only child by his mother and grandmother, spending summers working in the family's restaurant. Alfieri, a  self-described 'class clown', created his own sketch comedy act to entertain friends.

At the age of 18, a photographer invited him to do an advertising shoot and soon he graced the covers of several Italian magazines, known as fotoromanzi. His modeling career was cut short, when during an encounter with three muggers his face was scarred by injuries requiring more than 56 stitches.

In 1991, Alfieri turned from modeling to join the Italian Police Force. He quit the force after two and a half years of service and, determined to start a career in Hollywood, Alfieri packed his bags and moved to Los Angeles, to the disbelief of his relatives back in Italy.

Alfieri quickly landed work as an actor, with various television spots and two contracts roles on daytime TV Days of Our Lives (1996–1998) and The Bold and the Beautiful (1999–2000, 2004, 2009).

Since leaving daytime television, Alfieri has appeared in American and international productions. He drew international attention for playing the handsome sensitive gigolo in The Roman Spring of Mrs. Stone (2003) (TV) opposite Helen Mirren and Anne Bancroft.

Internationally, Alfieri completed two high-profile European productions back-to-back. Prior to that, he starred in the mini-series entitled Elisa di Rivombrosa (2003), a period piece based on the novel Pamela written by Samuel Richardson. Alfieri plays a sword-wielding assassin named Zanni La Morte.

Alfieri was next seen in a supporting role in THINKFilm's', My Sexiest Year (2007), a coming-of-age dramedy set in the 70s starring Frankie Muniz and Harvey Keitel. He portrays "Fabrizio Contini", a playboy who competes with Muniz for the affections of Amber Valletta.

I-See-You.Com (2006) saw Alfieri starring opposite Rosanna Arquette and Beau Bridges. Alfieri produced, wrote and directed his first short film which he is developing into a full-length feature. "J.E.S.", a horror/suspense/mystery that was shot in an ancient village outside Rome.

In 2021 Alfieri played his first lead in an American production My Secret Billionaire (2021) according to listings, but, previously released in 2009 as A Secret Promise.  A love story shot in New York City, the film also stars Ione Skye, Ron Silver and Talia Shire. In 2009, Alfieri had a minor role in the film Angels & Demons, as Carabinieri Lieutenant Valenti. Alfieri has started his own production company, Black Knight Entertainment.  In June 2010, he starts as Stefano D'Angelo in the  Christopher McQuarrie NBC series Persons Unknown. Later he stars on the NBC new series Undercovers created and directed by "J. J. Abrams". In 2010/11 he stars as Victor Cifuentes in the popular series Southland. In May 2011 he produced, directed, and wrote his first feature. He starred as Razel in the  Danny Wilson's film Nephilim.

External links
 

1971 births
Living people
Male actors from Rome
Italian expatriates in the United States
20th-century Italian male actors
21st-century Italian male actors
Italian emigrants to the United States